was a Japanese film actor noted for his leading roles in a number of films by the director Yasujirō Ozu including Brothers and Sisters of the Toda Family (1941), Tea Over Rice (1952), Equinox Flower (1958) and Late Autumn (1960). He also directed over a dozen films.

Selected filmography

Film

1931: Misu nippon - San-chan
1931: Hokuman no teisatsu
1932: Minato no jojôshi - Shinoshima
1932: Sôretsu bakudn sanyûshi
1932: Saraba Tokyo
1932: Kiri no yo no kyakumâ
1933: Joseijin
1935: Akogare
1935: Jinsei no onimotsu - Kimimasa Hashimoto
1936: Kanjô sanmyaku
1936: Kazoku kaigi
1936: Oboroyo no onna - Doctor
1936: Dansei tai josei - Yukio, Atsumi's first son
1936: Hitozuma tsubaki
1936: Shindo (part 1, 2) - Toru Nogami
1937: Kôjô no tsuki - Miura
1937: Shu to midori
1937: Joi Kinuyo sensei - Yasuo Asano
1937: Konjiki yasha - Jôsuke Arao
1937: Konyaku sanbagarasu - Shin Miki
1937: Otoko (part 1, 2)
1937: Shingun no uta
1938: Shuppatsu
1938: Han-shojo - Sôkichi Maeda
1938: Haha to ko
1938: Anma to onna - Shintarô Oomura
1938: Aizen katsura - Hattori
1938: Katei nikki - Shûzô Ubukata
1939: Minamikaze - Michio Nito
1939: Ani to sono imoto
1939: Zoku aizen katsura - Hattori
1939: Hana no aru zassô - Mr Hiramatsu
1939: Aizen katsura - Kanketsu-hen - Hattori
1939: Danryu - Yuzo Hibiki
1940: Kinuyo no hatsukoi - Shoichiro Kiriyama
1940: Seisen aiba fu: Akatsuki ni inoru
1940: Tokai no honryu - Keichi Hatta
1940: Nishizumi senshacho-den - Hosoki, Commander
1941: Brothers and Sisters of the Toda Family (戸田家の兄妹 Toda-ke no kyodai) - Shojiro Toda
1941: Hana wa itsuwarazu - Jôtarô
1941: Genkide yukôyo
1941: Akatsuki no gasshô
1941: Joi no kiroku - Teacher Kamiya
1942: There Was a Father - Yasutaro Kurokawa
1942: Kanchô imada shisezu
1942: Minami no kaze mizue no maki
1943: Aiki minami e tobu
1943: Hiwa Normanton jiken: Kamen no butô - Seiichiro Tsuneoka
1943: Wakaki sugata - Karasawa, army doctor
1943: Haha no kinembi
1944: Fuchinkan gekichin
1944: Yasen gungakutai - Sonoda shoi
1944: Rikugun - Captain
1944: Nichijô no tatakai
1945: Kita no san-nin - Iwao Hara
1945: Izu no musumetachi - Miyauchi
1946: Kanojo no hatsugen
1948: Yuwaku - Ryukichi
1949: Shitto
1949: Musume jûhachi usotsuki jidai - Nisaku Maki
1949: Beni imada kiezu
1949: Wakare no tango
1950: Shikko yuyo
1950: Kikyô - Kyokichi Moriya
1950: Hatsukoi mondo
1951: Onna no mizu-kagami - Manabe
1951: Jiyû gakkô
1951: Aa seishun
1951: Fusetsu 20 nen
1952: Rikon (離婚 Rikon) - Daisuke Sakuma
1952: The Flavor of Green Tea over Rice  Tea Over Rice (お茶漬けの味 Ochazuke no aji) - Mokichi Satake
1952: Dôkoku
1952: Nami
1952: Jinsei gekijo: dai ichi bu/dai ni bu
1953: Hiroba no kodoku - Kôtarô Hraguchi
1955: Bomeiki
1955: Aogashima no kodomotachi - Onna kyôshi no kiroku - Mr. Shimada
1955: Uruwashiki haha - Tomitarô Ôta
1956: Kuro-obi sangokushi - Masazumi Amaji
1956: Izumi
1956: Aijô no kessan - Narasaki
1956: Kon'yaku sanbagarasu
1956: Gunshin Yamamoto gensui to Rengô kantai - Adm. Isoroku Yamamoto
1957: Chijo - Ichiro Amano
1958: Yoru no kamome
1958: Akutoku
1958: Equinox Flower (彼岸花 Higanbana) - Wataru Hirayama
1959: Anata to watashi no aikotoba: Sayônara, konnichiwa - Gosuke Aota
1959: Haru o matsu hitobito
1959: Fubuki To Tomoni Kieyukinu - Mamoru Kitagawa
1959: Hanran - Sahei Sanada
1959: Waga ai - Reisaku Niizu
1960: Late Autumn (秋日和 Akibiyori) - Soichi Mamiya
1961: Uzu
1961: Hunting Rifle - Misugi
1973: Rise, Fair Sun - Inashiro
1974: Karei-naru Ichizoku - Daisuke Manpyo
1974: Castle of Sand - Ex-Finance Minister Tadokoro
1974: The Fossil - Tajihei Kazuki
1975: Tôkyô-wan enjô
1977: Yakuza senso: Nihon no Don - Kazumasa Sakura
1977: Hell's Gate Island (a.k.a. The Devil's Island) (獄門島 Gokumon-to) - Priest Ryônen
1977: Nippon no Don: Yabohen - Kazumasa Sakura
1978: Jiken
1978: Kôtei no inai hachigatsu - Kozo Ohata
1978: Nihon no Don: Kanketsuhen - Kazumasa Sakura
1979: Haitatsu sarenai santsu no tegami - Mitsumasa Karasawa
1979: Nihon no Fixer
1979: Moeru aki
1980: Warui yatsura - Judge
1980: Jishin rettô
1981: Akuryo-To - Captain Daizen
1982: Kaseki no kouya - Haruyoshi Nakaomi (final film role)

Television
1963–1964: Akatsuki (NHK Asadora)
1979-1980: Ashura no Gotoku - Koutaro Takezawa

References

External links

JMDb profile (in Japanese)

Japanese male film actors
Asadora lead actors
1909 births
1982 deaths
20th-century Japanese male actors
Japanese film directors
Actors from Hokkaido
Recipients of the Medal with Purple Ribbon